Gran Reserva is a Spanish drama television series, starring Emilio Gutiérrez Caba, Ángela Molina, Tristán Ulloa and Paula Echevarría, among others. Created by Ramón Campos and Gema R. Neira and produced by Bambú Producciones for TVE, the 42 episodes of the series aired on La 1 from 2010 to 2013. Charged with melodrama and thriller, the plot follows the conflict and intrigues between two winemaking families, the Cortázar and the Reverte, in the region of La Rioja.

Premise 
Heralded by Don Vicente Cortázar (Emilio Gutiérrez Caba), the patriarch, the Cortázar family embodies an aggressive and ruthless approach towards the winemaking business. Don Vicente is the father of Miguel (Tristán Ulloa), Raúl (Aitor Luna), Pablo (Francesc Garrido) and Emma (Ana Risueño), and represents the archetype of "evil character", while Raúl Cortázar and Gustavo Arístides also display "Machiavellian" masculine behaviours.

Conversely, the Reverte family, prone to the romanticisation of the business, is led by Doña Sofía Reverte (Ángela Molina), the mother of Daniel (Ricard Sales) and Lucía (Paula Echevarría), a journalist based on New York who returns to the cellars to help in the family business upon the sudden death of her father.

The attempted assassination of the first born son of the Cortázar, Miguel, is the trigger of the ensuing intrigues and feuds taking place in the series. Married to Paula (Belén Fabra), Miguel survives the attempt on his life, but loses his memory, experiencing a dramatic change in his personality.

Set in the countryside of La Rioja, the series takes place in a fictionalised version of the village of Briones  rendered as "La Siesta" or "Lasiesta".

Cast 

Introduced in season 2
 Thaïs Blume as Lorena, a waitress attracted to Daniel Reverte.
 Álvaro de Luna as Asensi, the chairman of the Council.
  as Nuria, the daughter of the chairman of the Regulatory Council.
 Yon González as Manuel "Manu" Hernández, the secretary of the Cortázar's cellars.
Introduced in season 3
  as Adolfo Reverte, Jesús Reverte's younger brother.
 Unax Ugalde as Carlos, Rosalía's son.
  as Mar Azpeitia, new oenologist at Bodegas Cortázar;
 Mariam Hernández as Ana, Lorena's sister.
 Úrsula Corberó as Julia, a lawyer.
Introduced in El pago de los Cortázar special episodes
 Fernando Andina as Javier.
 Marina San José as Ainhoa.
 Jorge Bosch as Navarro.

Production and release 

Created by Ramón Campos and Gema R. Neira and produced between La Rioja and Madrid, the first season of the series was shot between August 2009 and March 2010. The series premiered on 15 April 2010.

Shot in locations of La Rioja region such as Briones, the Valpiedra estate, Cenicero, Fuenmayor, Logroño, Haro and Alfaro, as well as some scenes in El Espinar (province of Segovia), and Chinchón, Aranjuez and Moralzarzal (Community of Madrid), the 13-episode second season began airing on 24 March 2011.

The third season premiered on 7 January 2013.

Instead of filming a fullfledged fourth season, TVE decided on the run to add 3 special episodes to the third season to round off the series. These were collectively known as "El pago de los Cortázar". Aired in April 2013, the special episodes were followed by a prequel series titled Gran Reserva. El origen.

The series was remade abroad in Chile (Reserva de familia; 2012) and Mexico (Caminos de Guanajuato; 2015).

References 
Informational notes

Citations

Bibliography
 
 
 

2010s Spanish drama television series
La 1 (Spanish TV channel) network series
2010 Spanish television series debuts
2013 Spanish television series endings
Television shows filmed in Spain
Television series about wine
Television shows set in La Rioja (Spain)
Television series by Bambú Producciones